Fabio Ramon Tomassini (born 5 February 1996) is a Samarinese association football midfielder who plays for Italian club Pietracuta and for San Marino national football team.

References

1996 births
Living people
Sammarinese footballers
San Marino international footballers
Association football midfielders